Zainab Amin Ansari (– January 2018) was a seven-year-old Pakistani girl who was abducted in her hometown of Kasur, Punjab while she was on her way to Quran recitation classes on 4 January 2018. Her body was found discarded five days later within a garbage disposal site near the city of Lahore on 9 January 2018; an autopsy report disclosed that she had been extensively raped and tortured before being strangled to death. Her rapist and murderer, 24-year-old Imran Ali, was arrested and identified as a serial killer responsible for at least seven previous rapes and murders of prepubescent girls in the region.

Ansari's murder incited widespread protests and outrage throughout Pakistan, and ultimately led to the passage of Pakistan's first national child safety law, known as the Zainab Alert Bill (similar to the AMBER Alert system in the United States). The bill directs that any individual found guilty of child abuse faces a minimum mandatory sentence of life imprisonment and also stipulates instigating legal action against any law enforcement officials who cause any unnecessary delay in investigating such cases within two hours of a child being reported as missing.

Event 
The incident occurred when Ansari's parents were in Saudi Arabia to perform Umrah, while she was temporarily living with her uncle. On 4 January 2018, she went missing while on her way to a Quran tuition class near her home. Her uncle, Muhammad Adnan, lodged a complaint with the Kasur District police office. CCTV video footage discovered by Ansari's family without any aid from local authorities showed her accompanied by an unknown bearded man in white clothes and a jacket, holding her hand and walking on Peerowala Road in Kasur. Her body was later discovered at a garbage disposal site on Shahbaz Khan Road on 9 January 2018. An autopsy report confirmed that she had been raped, sodomised and tortured before being strangled to death.

Protests
Prior to the rape and murder of Ansari, the province of Punjab had seen several pedophilia scandals, with local law enforcement accused of inaction and/or cover-up efforts. Following Ansari's murder, protests were held in many major cities across Pakistan, including the capital of Islamabad, which saw candlelight vigils, vehicles burned, roads blockaded and several clashes between protestors and police; two people were killed after they had broken into a police station. Four policemen who allegedly opened fire at protesters in Kasur were reportedly arrested and under investigation.

Reactions 
The former Chief Minister of Punjab, Shehbaz Sharif, tweeted:

Nobel Peace Prize laureate Malala Yousafzai wrote on Twitter: "This has to stop. [Government] and the concerned authorities must take action."

Imran Khan tweeted: "The condemnable & horrific rape & murder of little Zainab exposes once again how vulnerable our children are in our society."

Islamic cleric Muhammad Tahir-ul-Qadri, a political rival of the former ruling Pakistan Muslim League party, "demanded the local government be replaced, saying it has 'no right to remain in power after the killing of Zainab Ansari.

Kiran Naz, a Samaa TV news anchor, hosted a 10 January bulletin with her young daughter on her lap as an act of protest. At the Sindh Assembly, artist celebrities Ayesha Omer, Nadia Hussain, Faysal Qureshi and others met on 12 January with Deputy Speaker Shehla Raza, demanding laws and justice to prevent such tragedies in the future. Mahira Khan, Ali Zafar, Imran Abbas, Mawra Hocane, and Saba Qamar, as well as former cricket players Wasim Akram and Shoaib Akhtar tweeted about the incident, condemning the brutal rape and murder, while also trending the hashtag #JusticeforZainab.

Arrest
Shehbaz Sharif announced the arrest of a suspect, Imran Ali, in a press conference on 23 January 2018. He confirmed that polygraph tests and the DNA of the suspect matched with the samples of at least eight minor girls, including Ansari, who were raped and murdered within the same neighbourhood. Ali was a 24-year-old mechanic who lived in Ansari's neighbourhood, and further investigations disclosed that he had even taken part in the protests following the discovery of Ansari's body. Police also found the jacket worn by the suspect, which was seen in the CCTV footage showing Ansari just before she disappeared. Ali eventually confessed to having committed the serial rapes and murders.

Sentencing 
On 17 February 2018, an anti-terrorism court in Lahore Central Jail found Ali guilty for the rape and murder of Ansari and twelve other underage girls. He was executed by hanging on 17 October 2018 at 05:30 local time.

Zainab Alert Bill

In 2020, the Parliament of Pakistan passed the Zainab Alert, Response and Recovery Act, 2019, colloquially known as the Zainab Alert Bill, named after Ansari. The bill outlines various systems designed to improve the country's responses to missing child cases.

See also
 Kasur child sexual abuse scandal
Rape in Pakistan

References

External links
 Samaa TV Zainab murder suspect’s confessional video

2010s crimes in Punjab, Pakistan
2010s trials
2018 in Punjab, Pakistan
2018 murders in Pakistan
Deaths by person in Pakistan
January 2018 crimes in Asia
January 2018 events in Pakistan
Female murder victims
Formerly missing people
Kasur District
Kidnappings in Pakistan
Missing person cases in Pakistan
Murder in Punjab, Pakistan
Murder trials
People executed by Pakistan
Protests in Pakistan
Rape in Pakistan
Rape in the 2010s
Rape trials
Trials in Pakistan
Incidents of violence against girls
Male serial killers
Executed Pakistani people
Executed serial killers
Pakistani people convicted of murder
Pakistani people convicted of rape
Violence against women in Pakistan